Erwin Gohrbandt (born September 20, 1890 in Schlawe, Pomerania, died January 3, 1965 in West Berlin) was a German surgeon and university teacher. He was one of the first surgeons to perform sex reassignment surgery. Gohrbandt served as vice president of the Berlin regional association of the German Red Cross. He was also a member of the German Olympic Society.  In 1950-51 he was chairman of the Berlin Surgical Society.

His younger brother Paul Gohrbandt (1896–1975) was also a doctor.

Life
After graduating from high school in Treptow an der Rega in 1910, Gohrbandt studied medicine from 1910 to 1914 at the Kaiser Wilhelm Academy for Military Medical Education in Berlin. In 1910 he became a member of the Pépinière Corps Franconia. At the beginning of the First World War he was drafted into military service as a junior doctor. During his military service, he passed the state examination in January 1915 and received his medical license in 1917.

Before the war
He was then assigned to the Pathological Institute of the Charité. Between 1920 and 1928 he worked at the surgical university clinic of the Charité, from 1924 as senior physician and head of the pediatric surgery department. In 1924, he habilitated in surgery and began teaching. On June 6, 1928 he was appointed Associate Professor of Surgery at the Friedrich Wilhelm University in Berlin. In the same year, he moved to the city hospital Am Urban as chief physician of the II. Surgical Department.

In 1931, Gohrbandt, with Ludwig Levy-Lenz 
, was one of the first surgeons to perform sex reassignment surgery with vaginoplasty on some transsexual patients - a pioneering experimental achievement at the time. Known by name are the patients Dora Richter, a domestic worker at the Institute for Sexology under Magnus Hirschfeld, and the Danish artist Lili Elbe.

During the National Socialist period, Gohrbandt was a research assistant for surgical questions in the Social Office of the Reich Youth Leader.

During the Second World War
From August 1939, Gohrbandt was a consultant surgeon to the army and (from 1940) as the inspector of medical services in the Luftwaffe.

With effect from October 1, 1940, he became Head of the Surgical Department at the Municipal Robert Koch Hospital and at the same time became Clinic Director of the Third Appointed Surgical University Clinic. Gohrbandt participated in the conference on medical questions in distress and winter death on October 26 and 27, 1942. From 1944 he was a member of the scientific advisory board of the General Commissioner for the Sanitation and Health Service Karl Brandt. He participated in the development of human experiments conducted on prisoners of the Dachau concentration camp, investigating the problems of mortality due to hypothermia.

Post-war period
In the post-war period, he was Ferdinand Sauerbruch's deputy in the office of the city council for health care in all of Berlin. He was commissioned by the Soviet military administration in Germany and the Berlin magistrate to ensure sanitation and to monitor hygiene regulations. He drove the reconstruction of the war-damaged Moabit Hospital and headed its surgical department until December 31, 1958. At the same time, he resumed his lectures at the newly founded Free University of Berlin and published the Central Journal for Surgery in 1946. Effective December 31, 1958, he retired. He ran an outpatient clinic in Berlin-Tiergarten until his death in 1965.

Honours
Iron Cross 2nd and 1st Class (First World War)
Knight's Cross of the War Merit Cross with Swords (February 1, 1945)
Grand Cross of Merit of the Federal Republic of Germany (1952)
Honorary professorship at the TH Berlin (1956)
Honorary member of the Berlin Surgical Society (1958)

Works
 1928: Lehrbuch der Kinderchirurgie, 1928
 1936: Chirurgische Fragen der Kinderheilkunde in der Praxis, 1936
As an editor
 Zentralblatt für Chirurgie

References

 Walther Killy, Rudolf Vierhaus (Hrsg.): Deutsche Biographische Enzyklopädie. München 1995–1999
 Rolf Winau, Ekkehard Vaubel: Chirurgen in Berlin: 100 Porträts. Berlin 1983
 Karl Philipp Behrendt: Die Kriegschirurgie von 1939 - 1945 aus der Sicht der Beratenden Chirurgen des deutschen Heeres im Zweiten Weltkrieg. (PDF; 2,3 MB) Dissertation, Freiburg im Breisgau, 2003
 Zum Wirken des Chirurgen Erwin Gohrbandt (1890–1965) für die Berliner Universität, den Magistrat der Stadt und die Berliner Chirurgische Gesellschaft. In: Zeitschrift für ärztliche Fortbildung, 84, 1990, S. 1005–1008

German surgeons
German sexologists
People from Berlin
1890 births
1965 deaths